United States v. Stewart may refer to:

 United States v. Stewart (1795), 
 United States v. Stewart (1940), interpreting a definition of the term "income" for the purpose of tax liability
 United States v. Stewart (2003), 348 F.3d 1132 (9th Cir. 2003), is a Ninth Circuit Court of Appeals case heard and decided in 2003 and then reconsidered by that same court in 2006 in light of an intervening Supreme Court decision

See also 
 Stewart v. United States (disambiguation)